is the third album by Japanese idol girl group Nogizaka46. It was released on 24 May 2017. It was number-one on the Oricon weekly Albums Chart, with 342,487 copies sold. It was also number-one the Billboard Japan Hot Albums and Top Albums Sales charts.

Release 
This single was released in 4 versions. Type-A, Type-B and a First press limited edition, regular edition.

Track listing

First press limited edition

Type A

Type B

charts

Weekly

Yearly

Sales

References

Nogizaka46 albums
Japanese-language albums
2017 albums